Thickened earlobes-conductive deafness syndrome, also known as Escher-Hirt syndrome, or Schweitzer Kemink Graham syndrome, is a rare genetic disorder which is characterized by ear and jaw abnormalities associated with progressive hearing loss. Two families worldwide have been described with the disorder.

Presentation 

People with the disorder often have the following symptoms:

Ear/Auditory 

 Microtia (abnormally small ears)
 Thick earlobes
 Conductive hearing loss
 Congenital auditory ossicle anomalies

Jaw 

 Micrognathia

Etiology 
Escher et al. described a family with dominantly inherited conductive deafness caused by ear anomalies in 1968 and Wilmot et al. described another family with the same symptoms and mode of inheritance in 1970, Schweitzer et al described the symptoms and declared a novel syndrome in 1984.

References 

Syndromes affecting hearing
Syndromes affecting the jaw
Rare genetic syndromes